Explorer S-66 (also called BE-A, acronym of Beacon Explorer-A), was a NASA satellite launched on 19 March 1964 by means of a Thor-Delta B launch vehicle, but it could not reach orbit due to a vehicle launcher failure.

Spacecraft 
Beacon Explorer-A was a small ionospheric research satellite instrumented with an electrostatic probe, a 20-, 40-, and 41-Hz ionospheric radio beacon, a passive laser tracking reflector, and a navigation experiment. Its primary objective was to obtain worldwide observations of total electron content between the spacecraft and the Earth. The spacecraft was an octagonal right prism -diameter terminated on top with a truncated octagonal pyramid on which the laser reflectors were mounted. Appended were four hinged paddles carrying solar cells.

Launch 
During the third stage operation, a malfunction of unidentified origin prevented successful orbit. Satellite and third stage descent were in the south Atlantic Ocean with no useful scientific data obtained.

See also 

 Explorer program

References 

Satellite launch failures
1964 in spaceflight